Zhao County (Zhaoxian), a historic town called Zhaozhou in the past, is located in the southwest of Hebei province  southeast of the provincial capital Shijiazhuang, and  south of Beijing. There are many historical sites in Zhao County, including the Anji Bridge, Yongtong Bridge, Tuoluonijing Tower, and Bailin (Cypress Grove) Temple. The county is also famous for its agricultural products: snowflake pears (xuehua pear), asparagus, and wheat.

Geography
Zhao Xian is located in the middle of North China Plain; its elevation is fairly low and topography fairly flat.

Administrative Divisions

Towns:
Zhaozhou, Fanzhuang, Beiwangli, Xinzhaidian, Hancun, Nanbaishe, Shahedian

Townships:
Qiandazhang Township, Xiezhuang Township, Gaocun Township, Wangxizhang Township

Climate

Notable residents
 Li Qi (Tang Dynasty poet)
 Li Yangbing, Tang Dynasty man of letters
 Tie Ning

References

External links
County government website
Zhaoxian Online

County-level divisions of Hebei
Shijiazhuang